Weymouth Wales is a Barbadian football club, based in Carrington Village in the parish of Saint Michael.

History
Weymouth Wales FC was founded on December 16, 1958. Having won several league and cup titles in the 1960s and 1970s as New South Wales and Pan- Am Wales, it was then renamed to Weymouth Wales. They continued their dominance in the 1980s and 90s.

Achievements
Barbados Premier Division: 18
1962, 1964, 1967, 1969, 1970, 1971, 1972, 1973, 1974, 1975, 1976, 1978, 1981, 1984, 1986, 2012, 2017, 2018

Barbados FA Cup: 11
 1967, 1969, 1970, 1972, 1975, 1984, 1987, 2011, 2014, 2016, 2017, 2019

Capelli Cup: 11
 2019

Current squad

References

Football clubs in Barbados